The Bengaluru International Film Festival, is an annual film festival held in Bengaluru, the capital of the Indian state of Karnataka, which previews films of all genres including documentaries from around the world. Founded in 1996, Suchitra Bangalore International Film Festival, was held for a week from 22 to 28 December 2006 in collaboration with Suchitra Film Society.  More than 100 films were screened during festival.

The film festival is now being organized by Karnataka Chalanachitra Academy and is supported by Government of Karnataka.

Events History
 1st Suchitra Bengaluru International Film Festival 2006, was held from 22 to 28 December 2006
 2nd Suchitra Bengaluru International Film Festival 2008, was held from 3 to 10 January 2008
 3rd Suchitra Bengaluru International Film Festival 2009, was held from December 2009
 4th Bengaluru International Film Festival 2011, was held from 15 to 22 December 2011
 5th Bengaluru International Film Festival 2012, was held from 20 to 27 December 2012
 6th Bengaluru International Film Festival 2013 , was held from 26 December 2013 to 2 January 2014
 7th Bengaluru International Film Festival 2014, was held from 4 to 11 December 2014 
 8th Bengaluru International Film Festival 2016,  was held from January 28, 2016 to February 5, 2016.
 9th Bengaluru International Film Festival 2017, was held from 2 to 9 February 2017
 10th Bengaluru International Film Festival 2018, was held from 22 February 2018 to 1 March 2018
 11th Bengaluru International Film Festival 2019, was held from 21 February 2019 to 28 February 2019
 12th Bengaluru International Film Festival 2020, was held from 26 February 2020 to 4 March 2020
 13th Bengaluru International Film Festival 2022, will be held from March 3 to March 10 2022

Movies Screened during Festival
13th BIFFES 2022 Movies List

References

External links
 http://biffes.org/